Rio Alto Mining was a Vancouver-based international gold producer engaged in the exploration, development, and production of mineral resource properties throughout Latin America, with its principal asset, the La Arena mine, in La Libertad Region, Peru. The company and its assets were acquired by Tahoe Resources, Inc. in 2015, and the company no longer exists.

Operations
Rio Alto's annual gold production exceeded 200,000 ounces from its La Arena mine.

In 2008, Rio Alto purchased La Arena from Iamgold for $48 million. In May 2011, the company poured its first gold from operations at La Arena. Tahoe Resources announced a merger with Rio Alto Mining on February 9, 2015 for $1.12B.  The merger was completed on April 1, 2015.

References

Companies formerly listed on the New York Stock Exchange
Companies formerly listed on the Toronto Stock Exchange
Gold mining companies of Canada